, stylized as NISIOISIN to emphasize the palindrome, is a pseudonymous Japanese novelist, manga author, and screenplay writer.

Nisio debuted in 2002 with the novel The Beheading Cycle (the first in his Zaregoto series), which earned him the 23rd Mephisto Prize at twenty years of age. In 2005, he began his long-running Monogatari novel series, which was published in 28 volumes as of 2021, and was later adapted as a highly-successful animated series of the same name, produced by Shaft. His Katanagatari novels, Medaka Box manga series, Jūni Taisen novel, and The Beheading Cycle have also been adapted as anime. He has also collaborated with Death Note writer Tsugumi Ohba and illustrator Takeshi Obata to write the light novel Death Note Another Note: The Los Angeles BB Murder Cases.  Between 2009 and 2016, he ranked among the top 10 best-selling authors in Japan, ranking as the best-selling in 2012 and 2014. As of November 2022, his novels and manga had over 36 million copies in circulation.

Nisio's works frequently feature lengthy and witty dialogues. He is viewed as an author that blends regular novels and light novels, going through the genres of mystery, sekaikei, and shindenki, with frequent references to other manga and anime.

Career
Nisio Isin was a manga enthusiast since childhood and wanted to become a mangaka. However, seeing a lack of improvement in his drawing ability, he decided to become a novelist, mentioning that it didn't matter if his handwriting was subpar. He attended the Ritsumeikan University College of Policy Science and left the university without graduating.

During his early career when he submitted work for magazines, Nisio's writing speed was a selling point, and he once submitted two or three works to a single Mephisto Prize. In 2002, Nisio debuted with the first novel of the Zaregoto series, Kubikiri Cycle: The Blue Savant and the Nonsense User, earning him the 23rd Mephisto Prize. He was twenty years of age at the time, and his slogan was "Nisio Isin, the 20-year-old from Kyoto". Afterward, he proceeded to write the second title in the series, Strangulation Romanticist, in three days.

He still works with the Mephisto magazine, and worked with Kodansha on the literary magazines Faust, and Pandora. He also published his Katanagatari series as twelve volumes over twelve months for the Kodansha Box line in 2007; Ryūsui Seiryōin was matching this output, and the Kodansha Box website stated that it was the first time in the world two authors had done twelve-volume monthly novel series simultaneously.

Nisio Isin is best known for the Monogatari series, which began as a trilogy of short stories on the Mephisto magazine in 2005, and developed into a series with 28 volumes. It has been adapted as anime up to Zoku Owarimonogatari, and it has also been adapted as manga. The series has consistently achieved a high number of sales, with the anime's first two seasons alone, Bakemonogatari and Nisemonogatari, selling over one million DVDs and Blu-rays combined as of September 2012.

The first volume of Zaregoto, his Katanagatari and Medaka Box series, his Jūni Taisen novel, and the Pretty Boy Detective Club series have all been adapted into anime as well. Juni Taisen was also adapted as a Stage Play in Japan in 2018. His Bōkyaku Tantei series was adapted as a Japanese Drama in 2015. Several of his series have been adapted as manga.

In February 2008, his novel Death Note Another Note: The Los Angeles BB Murder Cases, based on the Death Note manga, was released in English by Viz Media. Del Rey Manga released the first and second volume in his Zaregoto series, which were revised for a rerelease by Vertical and followed by a translation of the third volume. Vertical is translating other titles and series by Nisio Isin, including Monogatari, Katanagatari, Pretty Boy Detective Club, and Imperfect Girl.

From 2009 to 2016, Nisio Isin was one of the top 10 best-selling authors in Japan, achieving a place in the top 3 for three years and, in 2012 and 2014, ranking first place as the best-selling author in the country. In those years, he sold 1,408,319 copies and 997,211 copies, respectively. As of November 2022, his novels and manga had over 36 million copies in circulation. The Publishers Weekly'''s Translation Database reported that from 2008 to 2018, 19 of Nisio's novels were translated into English, putting him as the second author with the most English translations of that period in the U.S.

Style
Since Nisio's debut, wordplay and tongue-in-cheek dialogue have been characteristic of his works. When asked if his use of manzai comedy was related to the fact he is from the Kansai region, he replied "I think it's certainly because I'm a Kansai person." He feels that "dialogue is the character" and focuses more on dialogue than appearance. Nisio features many women in his works because "it is easier for them to express their individuality" explaining that "women are much more adorned as characters (e.g. fashion) than men".

His greatest influence comes from such things as Shōnen Jump manga and shōjo manga en masse. About manga, he is a passionate fan of JoJo's Bizarre Adventure; in a dialogue with Hirohiko Araki, the author of the manga, he commented this is "a manga he would like all humanity to read." Among his references, references to JoJo are particularly common and in a novelization project of the series called "VS JOJO", together with Kouhei Kadono and Ōtarō Maijō, he wrote one of the novels that were published, called JoJo's Bizarre Adventure Over Heaven.

His works are characterized by a sense of literature that is amid the so-called "Shindenki" (ja) mystery-light novel genre, in which insane characters attempt to solve a mystery in a situation that would be impossible or unlikely in reality; and inexhaustible quotations of anime and manga from the past. He is well regarded as an author who has blended the conventions of mystery novels and character-driven light novels. Tsunehiro Uno describes Nisio Isin as the only writer who has made a smooth transition from "Sekaikei" (ja) to "Shindenki".

He has made no secret of his policy of not doing crossover or linking in his Zaregoto series. This is because crossover and linking was a technique Kouhei Kadono, whom he admires, excelled at, and so he decided to stick with the opposite style, but he replied he made an exception for the Ningen series because he began writing it as an homage to the relationship between the Kouhei Kadono's Boogiepop series and Beat's Discipline. He still maintains a steady writing pace and develops several series at the same time, but until Mazemonogatari, he did not link his works to each other. After fifteen years of non-crossover writing, he decided it was time to try a new pattern.

He has a unique way of naming his characters. He seeks to define his characters by their names, and he does not simply give them unusual names, but instead establishes some rules for them, although he will occasionally deviate from these rules. When it comes to naming, he has been described as "bizarre" and "extremely strange". Examples are Namanie Nienami, Kiki Kikitsu, Shibuki Shibushi, Mukae Emukae, Momo Momozono, Kajiki Kurokami, Kariteru Kanaino, Sukinasaki Saki, Shikigishi Kishiki, Kiss-shot Acerola-orion Heart-under-blade, Backyard Bottomslash, Quarter Queen, Sagano Usagi, Byōinzaka Kuroneko (which translates roughly as "Black Cat of Hospital Hill") and Shikizaki Kiki.

He said he learned much from the novels of Kiyoshi Kasai (the author of Vampire Wars), Hiroshi Mori, Natsuhiko Kyogoku, Ryūsui Seiryōin and Kouhei Kadono. He has also stated the five writers were, metaphorically speaking, God-like beings, who had shaped and molded his writing style.

Nisio and light novels
Most of Nisio's works are published by Kodansha Novels, a general literature imprint, but are sometimes classified as light novels. In a conversation with Tow Ubukata, Otsuichi said of Nisio, "I think he falls into the light novel category in a broad sense." The January 2005 issue of Nikkei Characters! introduces Nisio as "a new generation of writers who are breaking down the barriers between general literature and light novels." The Nisio Isin Chronicle describes his Zaregoto series as "often regarded as a light novel". Kiyoshi Kasai talking about light novels in the 2004 special edition of Eureka, commented that, although having the Zaregoto series ranked in a guide for light novels could be out of place, the influences Nisio had in his writing are easy to see, such as Kimi to Boku no Kowareta Sekai's academy romance, fighting pretty girls, moe characters, and Sekaikei-like settings, so it is not strange to see his works through the lenses of light novels.

In the 2004 edition of the light novel guide book This Light Novel is Amazing! 2005, the Zaregoto series ranked as the second most popular light novel series, but the authors wrote: "There are different opinions on whether the Zaregoto series is a light novel or not." Taking into account various opinions on "bunko is the light novel", "packaging", "age of the characters", and other factors, the book's Genre Guide refers to the Zaregoto series and Kimi to Boku no Kowareta Sekai as "borders" outside of the bunko. In the following year's This Light Novel Is Amazing! 2006, the Zaregoto series ranked first, and in an interview held to commemorate this, Nisio said, "I'm unsure if it's a light novel" commenting that "it's not a light novel in the sense that it's 'not a light novel label,' but it's part of a light novel in the sense that 'it's a collaboration between an illustration and a novel,'" and he also said that he has no qualms about his work being identified as a light novel.

Works in English translation
NovelsZaregoto series
 Zaregoto, Book 1: DECAPITATION: Kubikiri Cycle - The Blue Savant and the Nonsense User (Del Rey. 2008. , Vertical. 2017. ) – the winning work of the 23rd Mephisto Prize (2002) 
 Zaregoto, Book 2: STRANGULATION: Kubishime Romanticist - No Longer Human - Hitoshiki Zerozaki (Del Rey. 2010. , Vertical. 2018. )
 Zaregoto, Book 3: SUSPENSION: Kubitsuri High School - the Nonsense User's Disciple (Vertical. 2019. )

Monogatari seriesKIZUMONOGATARI: Wound Tale (Vertical. 2015. )BAKEMONOGATARI, Part 1: Monster Tale (Vertical. 2016. )BAKEMONOGATARI, Part 2: Monster Tale (Vertical. 2017. )BAKEMONOGATARI, Part 3: Monster Tale (Vertical. 2017. )NISEMONOGATARI, Part 1: Fake Tale (Vertical. 2017. )NISEMONOGATARI, Part 2: Fake Tale (Vertical. 2017. )NEKOMONOGATARI (BLACK): Cat Tale (Vertical. 2017. )NEKOMONOGATARI (WHITE): Cat Tale (Vertical. 2018. )KABUKIMONOGATARI: Dandy Tale (Vertical. 2018. )HANAMONOGATARI: Flower Tale (Vertical. 2018. )OTORIMONOGATARI: Decoy Tale (Vertical. 2018. )ONIMONOGATARI: Demon Tale (Vertical. 2018. )KOIMONOGATARI: Love Tale (Vertical. 2019. )TSUKIMONOGATARI: Possession Tale (Vertical. 2019. )KOYOMIMONOGATARI, Part 1: Calendar Tale (Vertical. 2019. )KOYOMIMONOGATARI, Part 2: Calendar Tale (Vertical. 2019. )OWARIMONOGATARI, Part 1: End Tale (Vertical. 2019. )OWARIMONOGATARI, Part 2: End Tale (Vertical. 2020. )OWARIMONOGATARI, Part 3: End Tale (Vertical. 2020. )ZOKU OWARIMONOGATARI: End Tale (Cont.) (Vertical. 2020. )Katanagatari series
Omnibus 3-in-1 volumes.KATANAGATARI, 1: Sword Tale (Vertical. 2018. )KATANAGATARI, 2: Sword Tale (Vertical. 2019. )KATANAGATARI, 3: Sword Tale (Vertical. 2019. )KATANAGATARI, 4: Sword Tale (Vertical. 2020. )

Pretty Boy seriesBishōnen, Book 1: Pretty Boy Detective Club: The Dark Star that Shines for You Alone (Vertical. 2020. )Bishōnen, Book 2: The Swindler, the Vanishing Man, and the Pretty Boys (Vertical. 2020. )Bishōnen, Book 3: The Pretty Boy in the Attic (Vertical. 2021. )

Other books
 Death Note Another Note: The Los Angeles BB Murder Cases (Viz Media. 2008. )
 xxxHOLiC: AnotherHOLiC (Del Rey. 2008. )
 Juni Taisen: Zodiac War (Viz Media. 2017. )

Short stories
  Magical Girl Risuka (Faust 2. Del Rey. 2009. )
 This is the English translation of "Yasashii Mahō wa Tsukaenai" ( "Easy magic cannot be used"), the first story of Risuka series.
 Kyōko Okitegami in STAY HOLMES - Bōkyaku Tantei series.
 A short story published on May 2, 2020, in a project titled Day to Day on the website tree.
 Street For You A short story published on August 28, 2020, in a project titled Story for you on the website tree.

Manga
One-shotAfter School: 7th Class (Faust 1. Del Rey. 2008. )
This is the English translation of Hōkago, Nanajikan-me. one-shot story.Imperfect GirlAdaptation of the Shōjo Fujūbun novel.Imperfect Girl, 1 (Vertical Comics. 2017. )Imperfect Girl, 2 (Vertical Comics. 2018. )Imperfect Girl, 3 (Vertical Comics. 2018. )Juni Taisen: Zodiac WarAdaptation of the Jūni Taisen novel.Juni Taisen: Zodiac War (manga), Vol. 1 (VIZ Media LLC. 2018. )Juni Taisen: Zodiac War (manga), Vol. 2 (VIZ Media LLC. 2018. )Juni Taisen: Zodiac War (manga), Vol. 3 (VIZ Media LLC. 2019. )Juni Taisen: Zodiac War (manga), Vol. 4 (VIZ Media LLC. 2019. )

Bakemonogatari
Adaptation of the Monogatari series novels.BAKEMONOGATARI (manga), volume 1 (Vertical Comics. 2019. )BAKEMONOGATARI (manga), volume 2 (Vertical Comics. 2020. )BAKEMONOGATARI (manga), volume 3 (Vertical Comics. 2020. )BAKEMONOGATARI (manga), volume 4 (Vertical Comics. 2020. )BAKEMONOGATARI (manga), volume 5 (Vertical Comics. 2020. )BAKEMONOGATARI (manga), volume 6 (Vertical Comics. 2020. )BAKEMONOGATARI (manga), volume 7 (Vertical Comics. 2021. )BAKEMONOGATARI (manga), volume 8 (Vertical Comics. 2021. )BAKEMONOGATARI (manga), volume 9 (Vertical Comics. 2021. )BAKEMONOGATARI (manga), volume 10 (Vertical Comics. 2021. )BAKEMONOGATARI (manga), volume 11 (Vertical Comics. 2021. )BAKEMONOGATARI (manga), volume 12 (Vertical Comics. 2022. )BAKEMONOGATARI (manga), volume 13 (Vertical Comics. 2022. )BAKEMONOGATARI (manga), volume 14 (Vertical Comics. 2022. )BAKEMONOGATARI (manga), volume 15 (Vertical Comics. 2022. )BAKEMONOGATARI (manga), volume 16 (Vertical Comics. 2022. )BAKEMONOGATARI (manga), volume 17 (Vertical Comics. 2023. )Pretty Boy Detective ClubAdaptation of the novels with the same name.Pretty Boy Detective Club (manga), volume 1 (Vertical Comics. 2021. )Pretty Boy Detective Club (manga), volume 2 (Vertical Comics. 2021. )

Novels
Zaregoto series

The  is written by Nisio Isin and illustrated by Take. Nine volumes were published between February 2002 and November 2005. The tenth volume was published on February 8, 2023. It was followed by a spin-off series titled Ningen series starring the Zerozaki clan.  A second spin-off series titled Saikyō series focusing on the character Jun Aikawa was also released. All books were released in Japan by Kodansha Novels.

  (June 7, 2006. Kodansha. )
 A dictionary of the Zaregoto series telling the behind-the-scenes of the story. The 4-koma manga drawn by Take titled Zaregoto Ichiban (戯言一番) was re-released in the book.

Ningen series
Spin-off of the Zaregoto series, it is also known as the Zerozaki Ichizoku series. The illustrations are provided by Take. Published by Kodansha.

Saikyō series
Spin-off of the Zaregoto series telling the story of "Overkill Red" Jun Aikawa. It was first serialized in the Mephisto magazine. Published by Kodansha. Take handled the illustrations for the series again.

JDC Tribute series
The Japan Detectives Club was created by Ryūsui Seiryōin, and Nisio Isin is one of several authors to write novels using that setting. The third book is a compilation of the first two.

Sekai series
Interlinked mystery series with a different narrator telling the story each time. Published by Kodansha. Illustrated by Tagro.

 With the publication of the second novel, both books were also published in hard cover through Kodansha Box.

Risuka series

First serialized in Faust magazine with illustrations by Capcom's Kinu Nishimura. It was later published by Kodansha.

Monogatari series

The series was first created by Nisio Isin as a series of short stories for the Mephisto magazine. While his previous series, Zaregoto, featured large casts of characters, each Bakemonogatari story tends to introduce only one new character. The previously published stories, and some new ones, were eventually collected in two volumes as part of the Kodansha Box launch titles on November 2, 2006, and December 5, 2006, and it continued its 28-volumes publication until August 19, 2021. Vofan handled the illustrations for the series. The series is divided into five parts: First Season, Second Season, Final Season, Off Season, and Monster Season. On January 25, 2023, Nisio Isin announced a new novel to be published on May 17, 2023.

Mazemonogatari

In  Koyomi Araragi meets various heroines from other series written by Nisio Isin. This crossover stories were first distributed in sessions for the Kizumonogatari movies between 2016 and 2017. Kodansha collected those stories, with 3 new ones, and published in 2019. 

Related book
 Audio drama script
 (Kodansha. 2009. )
 Character commentary script
 (Kodansha. 2012. )
  (Kodansha. 2012. )
  (Kodansha. 2015. )
  (Kodansha. 2015. )

Katanagatari series

This twelve volume samurai epic with illustrations by Take was released one volume a month throughout 2007.

Maniwagatari

Maniwagatari takes place 200 years before Katanagatari, when the first Kyotōryū head, Kazune Yasuri, met Kiki Shikizaki.

Related book
 Audio drama script
 (Kodansha. 2010. )

Densetsu series
A complete series with 10 volumes published by Kodansha. The first volume was published as the "Nisio's longest book" at the time of its publication. The cover of the final volume was illustrated by Fuu Midori.

Medaka Box

Spin-off novels of the Medaka Box manga. Illustrated by Akira Akatsuki.

Related book
 - Illustrated by Akira Akatsuki. It was distributed as a booklet at Medaka Box DVD Premium Event on March 3, 2013.
 - (Shueisha. 2013. )

Bōkyaku Tantei series

Ongoing series with 14 volumes published by Kodansha. Illustrated by Vofan.

Jūni Taisen

After the one-shot publication in the one-shot series manga Ōgiri, the story told one day before those events was published in one volume by Shueisha on May 19, 2015, with the illustrations provided by Hikaru Nakamura. A sequel was released in 2017.

Bishōnen series

The "Pretty Boy Detective Club" was originally intended to be a group that would appear in the Bōkyaku Tantei series, but during the story's development, Nisio Isin decided it could be published as an independent title. Illustrated by Kinako. Twelve volumes were published by the Kodansha Taiga label.

Henkyaku Kaitou series
For the 20th anniversary of Nisio's debut in 2022, a new series was announced. Illustrated by Takolegs.

Novelizations

Other works
Nisio Isin has also published several single-volume works, with some of them receiving manga adaptations. All of them deal with different themes from the usual. Ningyō ga Ningyō is a novel that invokes the style of old Japanese nonsense horror novels; Nanmin Tantei is a detective novel, a style always present in Nisio Isin's writing, but much more prominent in this title; Shōjo Fujūbun is a suspense novel, and Ripogura! is a novel that highlights Nisio Isin's love for constrained writing, based on three short stories rewritten three times each following restrained writing rules. The Veiled Man Hypothesis was Nisio's 100th book.

Uncollected works
Nakoto Manuscript seriesNakoto or Pnakotic Manuscript, referencing the grimoires H. P. Lovecraft created, has been releasing since 2004.
 . Written in the Japanese magazine Eureka published by Seidosha in September 2004 issue. Illustrated by Akira Yamaguchi..
 . Illustrated by Yoko Nihombashi -  (January 30, 2006. ).
  -  (September 1, 2006. ).
 . Released in the  published by Kodansha in June 2008.
  -  (June 30, 2009. ).
  -  - Distributed in December 2020.

Shuugatari
Stories written for the Pandora magazine published by Kodansha. Illustrated by Maruboro Akai.
 SIDE-A -  (October 9, 2008. )
 SIDE-B -  (December 20, 2008. )
 NO-SIDE -  (April 21, 2009. )
 ONE-SIDE -  (August 21, 2009. )
 A fifth chapter titled GENOCIDE was planned for publication in Pandora Vol. 5 but never released, presumably due to Pandora itself being suspended.

Katanagatari series
  (Kodansha. January 20, 2009. )
 Art book illustrated by Take. Nisio Isin wrote short stories for it.

Sekai series
The fifth story titled  was serialized in the Mephisto magazine published by Kodansha.
  -  (August 7, 2009. )
  -  (December 8, 2009. )

Monogatari series

Since the release of the Bakemonogatari Anime Complete Guidebook on October 28, 2010, Nisio Isin has written more than 60 short stories related to the anime or manga adaptation. The stories happens throughout all the timeline of the story featuring different narrators. They usually are brief stories talking about a specific topic, commentaries on literature, etc. Only the short stories in Mazemonogatari were collected in a book.

Detective Urban Legend
A series written in the Mephisto magazine published by Kodansha.
  -  (December 7, 2011. )
  -  (April 5, 2012. )
  -  (August 7, 2012. )

Summer Vacation Sabotage
A story written in the Mephisto magazine published by Kodansha.
  - , August 4, 2016.

Bōkyaku Tantei series
Stories written for the Mephisto magazine published by Kodansha that were not collected yet.
  - , August 8, 2018.
  - , December 6, 2018.
  - , April 10, 2019.
  - , August 8, 2019.
  - , December 4, 2019.
 
 A short story published on May 2, 2020, in a project titled Day to Day on the website tree.
  - included in the Okitegami Kyōko no Kansatsu-hyō Special Free Paper distributed in the Japanese bookstores on April 27, 2021.

Derived from works by other authors
  -  (December 14, 2007. )
 A tribute based on the Hyakkiyakō series by Natsuhiko Kyogoku.
  -   written by Yoko Nihombashi. Published by Kodansha (July 1, 2010. )
 A story written in the official B5 booklet dōjin magazine titled Shōnen Fight.
  -  (August 29, 2014. )
 A story written in commemoration of the 150th serialization of the Nobunaga no Shinobi series.

Misc.
  -  (November 3, 2002)
 A story released in the dōjinshi magazine Tandem Rotor no Hōhōron in the first literary flea market on November 3, 2002.
 . Illustrated by Ōtarō Maijō -  (December 24, 2004. )
 Competition on the theme of "coming to Tokyo".
 . Illustrated by Ōtarō Maijō -  (December 24, 2004. )
 A relay novel with Otsuichi, Takekuni Kitayama, Yuya Sato and Tatsuhiko Takimoto.
  -  (July 13, 2010. )
 -  (April 7, 2012, Kodansha)
  -  (December 24, 2012, Kodansha)
  -  (December 5, 2013. )
 Fragment Novels (Nisio Isin Official Website)
 Self-Remix excerpts of his novels.
 Street For You A short story published on August 28, 2020, in a project titled Story for you on the website tree.
  - October issue of "Gendai Shousetsu" (September 22, 2022, Kodansha)

Commentary on the literature
 Ryūsui Seiryōin -  (Kodansha. January 1, 2003. )
 Tatsuhiko Takimoto -  (Kadowaka. June 25, 2004. )
 Hiroshi Mori -  (Kodansha. November 15, 2007. )
 Natsuhiko Kyogoku -  (Kodansha. June 12, 2009. )
 Yamori Mochizuki -  (Kodansha. August 6, 2009. On Kodansha's website (in Japanese))
 Mizuki Tsujimura -  (Kodansha. January 15, 2010. )
 Takeru Kaido -  (Kodansha. May 15, 2012. )

Manga
One-shots
Since the publication of the Hōkago, Nanajikan-me. one-shot in Comic Faust, Nisio Isin has been writing several original scripts for manga.

Ōgiri
Based on 9 themes suggested by his editor, Nisio Isin wrote 9 one-shots with various artists that were released on Shueisha's magazines between 2014 and 2015 in a period of four months. The collection of stories were published by Shueisha on April 3, 2015.

Medaka BoxMedaka Box is a Japanese shōnen manga series written by Nisio Isin and drawn by Akira Akatsuki. It was serialized in the Japanese magazine Weekly Shōnen Jump from May 11, 2009, to April 27, 2013. It was published by Shueisha in 22 volumes.

Kimi to Nadekko!Kimi to Nadekko! is a Japanese shōjo manga series written by Nisio Isin and drawn by Ema Tōyama. It is an in-universe manga written and drawn by Nadeko Sengoku, a female character from the Monogatari series. The 3 chapters were released in various ways in 2014. All three chapters were collected as an extra in the Koimonogatari Vol.2 BD set.

Shōnen ShōjoShōnen Shōjo is a Japanese shōnen manga series written by Nisio Isin and drawn by Akira Akatsuki. Shōnen Shōjo began serialization on January 4, 2016, and was published in Jump Square magazine until April 4, 2017, with a total of 16 chapters. Compiled by Shueisha into 3 volumes.

Seishun Kijinden! 240 GakuenLegend of Eccentric Youth! Nishio Academy (青春奇人伝！240学園, "240" is a pun with "Nishio") is a Japanese shōnen manga series drafted by Nisio Isin and drawn by Shiba Mochi. It was done in commemoration of the 15th year of Nisio Isin writing career and it features various characters from his other series. It began serialization on February 9, 2017, in Bessatsu Shōnen Magazine until November 9, 2018. Compiled by Kodansha into 3 volumes.

Cipher Academy

 is a Japanese shōnen manga written by Nisio Isin and drawn by Iwasaki Yūji. It started serializing in the Japanese magazine Weekly Shōnen Jump on November 21, 2022.

Screenplay
 Audiobook
  (Kodansha, Audible. December 29, 2022)
 A novel written first for the audio service Audible. Kenichi Suzumura is narrating the story. Kodansha will release the print version in 2023.
 Character commentary
 Audio commentaries are content available on the DVD/BD release of the Monogatari series and Kubikiri Cycle. Each episode features two characters having a conversation about the specific episode they are in. Nisio Isin has written each one of them. 
 Nisio Isin Daijiten A series of commentaries in the form of an audio guide with characters from Monogatari, Zaregoto, and Bōkyaku Tantei series written for the Nisio Isin Daijiten exhibition, held in Tokyo during 2017. A transcription of said audio guide has been published in the accompany pamphlet. Nisio Isin in this occasion also wrote the script for six FANDA Cards handed as a gift at the exhibition's visitors, each one with a different character giving a call on the phone of the visitors.
 Drama CD
 Monogatari series
  (Kodansha. August 3, 2009)
  (Aniplex. December 18, 2019)
 Katanagatari series
  (Kodansha. 2010)
 Episode 0 Kyotō Yasuri - An audiobook released in the DVD/BD of the twelve episodes of the Katanagatari anime. It contains 12 chapters telling the story in the rebellion twenty years before the main story. 
 Medaka Box , in 12 parts (Media Factory. 2012–2013)
 Pretty Boy Detective Club  (Aniplex. 2021)
  (Aniplex. 2021)
  (Aniplex. 2021)
  (Aniplex. 2021)
  (Aniplex. 2022)
 ScriptMedaka Box (TV)
 Episode 12 -  - Original air date: June 20, 2012.
 Medaka Box Abnormal (TV)
 Episode 12 -  - Original air date: December 27, 2012.
 Madoka Magica x Monogatari manner movies
 Four skits written by Nisio Isin about theater manners that were presented in the Japanese sessions for Puella Magi Madoka Magica The Movie -Rebellion- between October 26 and November 22, 2013.
 1st week (October 26 – November 1): Untitled (Ōgi Oshino Version)
 2nd week (November 2 – 8): Karen, Tsukihi Araragi, and the Witch (Karen Araragi & Tsukihi Araragi Version)
 3rd week (November 9 – 15): Mayoi and the Magical Girls (Mayoi Hachikuji Version)
 4th week (November 16 – 22): Hitagi and Kyubey (Hitagi Senjōgahara Version)Okitegami Kyōko no Bibōroku x Monogatari PVs. (2014. Directed by Yukihiro Miyamoto)
 Two advertisements for the first e-book of Nisio Isin, Okitegami Kyōko no Bibōroku, from the Bōkyaku Tantei series.
 Madogatari (Madoka Magica x Monogatari crossover)
 A crossover manner video shown in the Madogatari exhibition on September 22, 2016.
 Monogatari series in 120 seconds
 PV for the release of the final volumes of the Monogatari series, Shinomonogatari. Script written by Nisio Isin with Kana Hanazawa and Maaya Sakamoto voicing in-character, Nadeko Sengoku and Shinobu Oshino, respectively.
 Nisio Isin 20th anniversary movie
 A short video published on August, 7th and narrated by Zaregoto series' protagonist Ii in which Nisio Isin's career is summarized and volume 10 of said series is announced.

Related book
  (September 18, 2004. Seidosha. )
  (November 1, 2005. Gentosha. )
 Written by Ryūsui Seiryōin. Nisio cooperated as a special guest.
  (January 30, 2006. Takarajimasha Co. )
 Fan book containing an interview with Nisio Isin.
  (February 1, 2006. Takarajimasha Co. )
 Contains a dialogue with Nisio Isin.
  (March 12, 2008. Media Factory. )
 Nisio Isin lectured for five days as a special guest.
  (September 3, 2014. Kodansha. )
 Interview book where Nisio talks with Kentarō Kobayashi, Hiromu Arakawa, Chica Umino, Mizuki Tsujimura, and Toshiyuki Horie.
  (September 5, 2022). Kodansha.
 Nisio answers 240 questions of fans.

Adaptations
Anime

Manga
Nisio Isin has several adaptations of his novels for manga and since most of his novels are published by Kodansha, most of them comes out in magazines of the publisher.

Zerozaki Sōshiki no Ningen Shiken

First serialized in Pandora Vol. 2 Side-A, it was later transferred to the Japanese magazine Monthly Afternoon. It's an adaptation of the first volume of the Ningen series and it was drawn by Iruka Shiomiya. It was serialized from December 20, 2008, to August 2013. Compiled by Kodansha in 5 volumes.

Zerozaki Kishishiki no Ningen Knock

It was serialized in the Japanese magazine Monthly Afternoon from August 25, 2014, to September 24, 2016. It's an adaptation of the second volume of the Ningen series and it was drawn by Chomoran. Compiled by Kodansha in 4 volumes.

Okitegami Kyōko no Bibōroku

It was serialized in the Japanese magazine Monthly Shonen Magazine from August 6, 2015, to March 6, 2017. It partially adapts volumes 1 to 8 of the Bōkyaku Tantei series and it was drawn by Yō Asami. Compiled by Kodansha in 5 volumes.

Shōjo FujūbunShōjo Fujūbun is an adaptation of the novel with the same name and was drawn by Mitsuru Hattori. Mitsuri wanted to adapt the novel after reading it. It was serialized between November 30, 2015 and August 29, 2016, in the Japanese magazine Weekly Young Magazine. It was compiled by Kodansha in 3 volumes.

Himeiden
It was serialized in the Japanese magazine Young Magazine Third from December 4, 2015 to December 6, 2017. It's an adaptation of the first volume of the Densetsu series and it was drawn by Mitsutani Osamu. Compiled by Kodansha in 4 volumes.

Bishōnen Tanteidan

It was serialized in the Japanese magazine Aria from June 2016 until June 2018 because of Aria's termination. It was transferred to Shonen Magazine Edge on October 17, 2018 and the rest of the chapters were released until July 17, 2019. It's an adaptation of the first four volumes of the Bishōnen series, and it was drawn by Oda Suzuka. Compiled by Kodansha in 5 volumes.

Jūni Taisen

It was serialized in the Japanese magazine Shonen Jump+ from September 23, 2017, to May 12, 2018. It is an adaptation of the Jūni Taisen novel and it was drawn by Akira Akatsuki. Compiled by Shueisha in 4 volumes.

BakemonogatariBakemonogatari is an adaptation of the Monogatari series novels and is drawn by Oh! great. It began its serialization in Weekly Shōnen Magazine on March 14, 2018, with the last chapter published on March 15, 2023. It has been compiled by Kodansha with a special edition for the Kodansha Box label also published.

Risuka

 As part of the release of the fourth volume of the series, Hiro Mashima drew a scene from the chapter Easy magic cannot be used. of the first volume and Kodansha released it via Twitter on November 27, 2020. It was later published in the book  distributed in the Japanese bookstores.
 A manga adaptation started serializing on the May issue of Bessatsu Shōnen Magazine in 2021. Nao Emoto is handling the illustration.

TV Drama
Japanese drama. It adapted the first four volumes of the Bōkyaku Tantei'' series. Starring Yui Aragaki.

Stage Play
 Juni Taisen (2018)
 Labyrinth Revue: Bishounen Tanteidan (2021)

Notes

References

External links

 Nisio Isin Official Website 
 Nisio Isin Anime Project 
  

Nisio Isin
1981 births
21st-century Japanese novelists
Living people
Japanese mystery writers
Light novelists
Ritsumeikan University alumni
Japanese male writers
21st-century pseudonymous writers